Keith William Robert Fletcher  (born 20 May 1944) is an English former first-class cricketer who played for Essex and England. He later became England's team manager. His nickname was "The Gnome of Essex", so christened by his Essex teammate, Ray East, because Fletcher's winklepickers had begun to curl up at the toes due to wear.

Cricket writer Colin Bateman noted that "Fletcher was a tough cookie, a shrewd man who could bluff opponents like the most disarming of poker players. He evoked loyalty in his teammates and admiration from his opponents, even when they were beaten by the sucker punch". Bateman added "the sacking of Fletcher as England captain remains one of English cricket's shabbiest sagas".

Fletcher played 59 Test matches and 24 One Day Internationals. His Test tally of 3,272 runs came at an average of 39.90.

Life and career
Keith started playing for his village side while living with his parents in Caldecote, Cambridgeshire, before moving to Royston, Hertfordshire to play for the local cricket club's second team at the age of 13. It was not long before he moved up to play for the first team.

It was while playing for Royston that Fletcher hit his first-ever century, and he produced his finest bowling figures, taking 9–20 on his first-team debut.

His county cricket career at Essex began at the age of 17. He toured Pakistan with the MCC Under-25 side in 1966–67, and made his England Test debut in 1968 at Headingley against Australia. A baptism of fire, he found hostility from the Yorkshire crowd who felt that Phil Sharpe should have been preferred, and Fletcher's experience was not helped by dropping regulation catches at slip. A first innings duck seemed to be the portent of his early introverted batting stints in the national team.

However, Fletcher was a Wisden Cricketer of the Year in 1974.

His debut century for England did not occur until Fletcher's 20th Test appearance. He went on to score six more centuries, at a rate of one every eight Tests, his highest Test score of 216 coming against New Zealand in 1975. His cricketing nous was used by both Tony Lewis and Tony Greig when they led the national team, but like many England batters of his era he struggled against Australia, and particularly in dealing with the bowling of Jeff Thomson and Dennis Lillee in 1974–5; he did make one Test centuries in that Ashes series, in the final test when Thomson and Lillee were incapacitated by injury. He was dropped by England after the Centenary Test of 1977, and not recalled for over four years. Following Mike Brearley's retirement as England captain and Ian Botham's short tenure, Fletcher re-appeared to captain the side to India in 1981–82. The series did not go well, with negative tactics from both teams, and poor umpiring decisions, which saw Fletcher flick off the bails with his bat after being given out in the Second Test. Worse was to follow for Fletcher when Geoffrey Boycott was sent home, and Fletcher's belated awareness that half of his touring party, led by his county teammate Graham Gooch, were preparing for a rebel tour to South Africa. Fletcher captaincy of England oversaw a 1–0 series defeat over six Tests against India, before Fletcher's only victory in a Test match as captain, in a one-off Test against Sri Lanka. Fletcher took all the blame, despite turning down the chance to join the rebels himself because of his loyalty to the England cause. His was then ignominiously sacked by the chairman of selectors, Peter May.

Fletcher also captained Essex successfully in two spells (1974–1985 and 1988). As Bateman noted, Fletcher "turned a county of cheerful losers into an even happier bunch as the most successful side in the country through the 1980s". He captained Essex to three County Championships, in 1979, 1983 and 1984.  He was appointed an OBE in the 1985 New Year Honours.

From 1993 to 1995, Fletcher served as England team coach. During this period, the side played 26 Test matches, of which they lost 15 and won only five.

Later, Fletcher returned to Essex as first-team coach, stepping down in 2001, to be replaced by his former teammate Graham Gooch. He is currently the manager of the Essex U15s team.

References

External links

1944 births
Living people
England One Day International cricketers
England Test cricketers
English cricketers of 1969 to 2000
England Test cricket captains
Essex cricket captains
International Cavaliers cricketers
Officers of the Order of the British Empire
Wisden Cricketers of the Year
Cricketers at the 1975 Cricket World Cup
Marylebone Cricket Club cricketers
English cricketers
T. N. Pearce's XI cricketers
Young England cricketers
Marylebone Cricket Club Under-25s cricketers
Marylebone Cricket Club President's XI cricketers
Marylebone Cricket Club Touring Team cricketers